Anthurium brownii is a species of plant in the genus Anthurium native to Central and South America, from Costa Rica through Panamá, and south to Colombia, Ecuador, and Venezuela. First scientifically described in 1876, it was collected by Gustav Wallis and named for N. E. Brown.

References

brownii
Plants described in 1876